Marysville is an unincorporated community in Calhoun County, Florida, United States.  It is located on County Road 69.

Geography
Marysville is located at  (30.2944, -85.0983).

References

Unincorporated communities in Calhoun County, Florida
Unincorporated communities in Florida